Zdeněk Frolík (March 10, 1933 – May 3, 1989) was a Czech mathematician. His research interests included topology and functional analysis. In particular, his work concerned covering properties of  topological spaces, ultrafilters, homogeneity, measures, uniform spaces. He was one of the founders of modern descriptive theory of sets and spaces.

Two classes of topological spaces are given Frolík's name: the class P of all spaces  such that  is pseudocompact for every pseudocompact space , and the class C of all spaces  such that  is countably compact for every countably compact space .

Frolík prepared his Ph.D. thesis under the supervision of Miroslav Katetov and Eduard Čech.

Selected publications
Generalizations of compact and Lindelöf spaces - Czechoslovak Math. J., 9 (1959), pp. 172–217 (in Russian, English summary)
The topological product of countably compact spaces - Czechoslovak Math. J., 10 (1960), pp. 329–338
The topological product of two pseudocompact spaces - Czechoslovak Math. J., 10 (1960), pp. 339–349
Generalizations of the Gδ-property of complete metric spaces - Czechoslovak Math. J., 10 (1960), pp. 359–379
On the topological product of paracompact spaces - Bull. Acad. Polon., 8 (1960), pp. 747–750
Locally complete topological spaces - Dokl. Akad. Nauk SSSR, 137 (1961), pp. 790–792 (in Russian)
Applications of complete families of continuous functions to the theory of Q-spaces - Czechoslovak Math. J., 11 (1961), pp. 115–133
Invariance of Gδ-spaces under mappings - Czechoslovak Math. J., 11 (1961), pp. 258–260
On almost real compact spaces - Bull. Acad. Polon., 9 (1961), pp. 247–250
On two problems of W.W. Comfort - Comment. Math. Univ. Carolin., 7 (1966), pp. 139–144
Non-homogeneity of βP- P - Comment. Math. Univ. Carolin., 7 (1966), pp. 705–710
Sums of ultrafilters - Bull. Amer. Math. Soc., 73 (1967), pp. 87–91
Homogeneity problems for extremally disconnected spaces - Comment. Math. Univ. Carolin., 8 (1967), pp. 757–763
Baire sets that are Borelian subspaces - Proc. Roy. Soc. A, 299 (1967), pp. 287–290
On the Suslin-graph theorem - Comment Math. Univ. Carolin., 9 (1968), pp. 243–249
A survey of separable descriptive theory of sets and spaces - Czechoslovak Math. J., 20 (1970), pp. 406–467
A measurable map with analytic domain and metrizable range is quotient - Bull. Amer. Math. Soc., 76 (1970), pp. 1112–1117
Luzin sets are additive - Comment Math. Univ. Carolin., 21 (1980), pp. 527–534
Refinements of perfect maps onto metrizable spaces and an application to Čech-analytic spaces - Topology Appl., 33 (1989), pp. 77–84
Decomposability of completely Suslin additive families - Proc. Amer. Math. Soc., 82 (1981), pp. 359–365
Applications of Luzinian separation principles (non-separable case) - Fund. Math., 117 (1983), pp. 165–185
Analytic and Luzin spaces (non-separable case) - Topology Appl., 19 (1985), pp. 129–156

See also
Wijsman convergence

References

1933 births
1989 deaths
Charles University alumni
20th-century Czech mathematicians
Czech mathematicians
Topologists